Mennonites in Colombia were until 2016 almost only converts from the general and indigenous Colombian population to the Mennonite faith. Since then conservative Plautdietsch-speaking ethnic Mennonites, who belong to the so-called Russian Mennonites, started to immigrate to Colombia. 

Converts to the Mennonite faith are both people who speak Spanish and groups with an indigenous Amerindian background, notably Embera-Wounaan. These converts do not differ much from other Protestants in Colombia. 

Ethnic Mennonites have their own customs and language (Plautdietsch) and live in colonies. Conservative ethnic Mennonites normally look for a quiet and remote place where they can live according to their tradition.

History

From Europe to America 
Mennonites as a religious group can trace back their roots to the time of the Protestant Reformation. They belonged to the radical wing of the Reformation who tried to base its faith only on the Bible as God's word and live according to it.

Starting in 1683 (Germantown, Pennsylvania), Mennonites from Europe migrated to North America but most came in the 18th and 19th centuries. Mainly since the second half of the 19th century they split into different groups ranging from extremely conservative to very liberal.

Colombia 
Liberal and moderately conservative Mennonites engaged in worldwide missionary work like other North American Protestant denominations. In 1945 the Mennonite Brethren started missionary work among the Amerindian and general population in La Cumbre in Valle del Cauca and the corregimiento Noanama in Istmina, Chocó Department. In 1949 there were 50 believers and a missionary staff of 16 members. 

The missionaries learned the indigenous language und started to write religious texts in this language. Linguistic work on the Choco languages was done by Mennonite missionary Jacob Loewen.

Mission and social work was also done by the General Conference Mennonite Church near Cachipay, Anolaima and La Mesa, all in the department of Cundinamarca and in La Esperanza in the department Norte de Santander. In 1954 there were nine missionary workers and 81 baptized converts.

In 1990 there were four Anabaptist groups working in Colombia: the Iglesia Evangélica Menonita de Colombia, that resulted from the mission work of the General Conference Mennonites, the Asociación de Iglesias de los Hermanos Menonitas, stemming from the Mennonite Brethren mission work, the Iglesia Colombiana de los Hermanos, stemming from the mission work of the Brethren Church, Ashland, Ohio, starting in 1973, and the Comunidad Cristiana Hermandad de Cristo, stemming from the Brethren in Christ, starting in 1982. The membership of these four groups in 1986 was about 2,300.

Mennonite colonies 
Low German Mennonites started to settle in Colombia in February 2016, with immigrants coming mainly from the region around Cuauhtémoc, Chihuahua in northern Mexico, immigrants to Liveney colony mainly from Manitoba Colony and immigrants to Australia colony mainly from Ojo de la Yegua Colony (Nordkolonie), some 50 km north of Cuauhtémoc, Mexico, but others came from the United States, Canada and Bolivia. 

In 2018 there were three Mennonite colonies some 90 km far from Puerto Gaitán, Meta Department, Liviney (also known as Los Venados) with about 7.200 hectares, Australia with about 7.000 hectares and La Florida (also known as San Jorge) with about 2.000. In 2019 there is a new Mennonite colony named Buenos Aires (also known as Pajuil).

These Mennonites are mostly so-called "Russian" Mennonites who formed as an ethnic group in the 19th century in what is today Ukraine. They are moderately conservative. The forbid television and radio, but allow cars. They speak Plautdietsch and women dress plain. A 2020 survey found that there are more than 200 Mennonite colonies in nine Latin American countries, with 4 in Colombia.

Members and congregations 
In 2012 there were 2,825 members in 67 congregations.

References

Ethnic groups in Colombia
European Colombian
German diaspora in South America
Colombia
Colombia